Geoffrey Gete (born 3 August 1986 in Espiritu Santo, Vanuatu) is a footballer who plays as a defender. He currently plays for Tafea F.C. in the Vanuatu Premia Divisen and the Vanuatu national football team.

References

1986 births
Living people
Vanuatuan footballers
Vanuatu international footballers
Association football defenders
Sia-Raga F.C. players
2004 OFC Nations Cup players
2008 OFC Nations Cup players